Maddison Rocci (born 1 June 1998) is an Australian basketball player playing under the Southside Flyers. Originally playing as number 23 for the Canberra Capitals, Rocci made the move to the Southside Flyers for the 2021 Season sporting her new number 9 jersey.

Career

WNBL
After impressive showings in the South East Australian Basketball League (SEABL) with Basketball Australia's Centre of Excellence, Rocci was signed by the Canberra Capitals for the 2017–18 WNBL season.

National Team

Youth Level
Rocci made her international debut at the 2014 FIBA Under-17 World Championship in the Czech Republic with the Sapphires, where they placed fifth. She then made her debut with the Gems at the 2016 Oceania Championship in Fiji where Australia took home the Gold. Rocci then continued on with the Gems at the 2017 FIBA Under-19 World Championship in Italy, where the Gems placed sixth.

References

1998 births
Living people
Australian women's basketball players
Sportswomen from Victoria (Australia)
Guards (basketball)
Universiade medalists in basketball
Universiade gold medalists for Australia
Medalists at the 2019 Summer Universiade
People from East Melbourne
Basketball players from Melbourne